The Slate Range is a mountain range of the Canadian Rockies, located in Banff National Park, Canada. The range is named after slate, the primary composition of the mountains in the area.

The Lake Louise Ski Resort is on the southern slopes of this range.

This range includes the following mountains and peaks:

References

Ranges of the Canadian Rockies
Mountain ranges of Alberta
Mountains of Banff National Park